The 1873 Taunton by-election was fought on 13 October 1873.  The byelection was fought due to the incumbent MP of the Liberal Party, Henry James, becoming Solicitor General for England and Wales.  It was retained by Henry James who defeated Alfred Slade.

References

1873 in England
History of Taunton
1873 elections in the United Kingdom
By-elections to the Parliament of the United Kingdom in Somerset constituencies
Ministerial by-elections to the Parliament of the United Kingdom
19th century in Somerset
October 1873 events